A Man Needs a Woman is a 1968 album by James Carr. This would be the last of Carr's albums until his come-back album Take Me to the Limit in 1991.

After Carr's death in 2001, Kent Records re-released the album with several bonus tracks in 2003.

Track listing
 "A Man Needs a Woman" (O. B. McClinton) – 2:49
 "Stronger Than Love" (Clarence Shields) – 2:31
 "More Love" (Wayne Carson Thompson)     – 1:59
 "You Didn't Know It But You Had Me " (Dolly Greer, George Jackson) – 1:59
 "A Woman Is a Man's Best Friend" (Quinton Claunch, Rudolph V. "Doc" Russell) – 3:33
 "I'm a Fool for You" (Earl Cage, Claunch, Greer, Jackson, Russell) – 2:00
 "Life Turned Her That Way " (Harlan Howard) – 2:38
 "Gonna Send You Back to Georgia" (J. Hammonds Jr., Johnnie Mae Matthews) – 2:17
 "The Dark End of the Street" (Chips Moman, Dan Penn) – 2:34
 "I Sowed Love and Reaped a Heartache" (D. Lee, A. Reynolds) – 2:27
 "You've Got My Mind Messed Up" (McClinton) – 2:27

2003 bonus tracks
 "A Losing Game" (James Carr, Denny Weaver) – 2:01
 "A Message to Young Lovers" (Claunch, Russell) – 2:44
 "Let It Happen" (Spooner Oldham, Dan Penn) – 2:38
 "You Gotta Have Soul" – 1:49
 "You Hurt So Good" – 2:00
 "I Can't Turn You Loose" – 2:08
 "Let's Face Facts" (Lee Jones, Harold Thomas) – 2:26
 "Who's Been Warming My Oven" – 3:19
 "Please Your Woman" – 3:43
 "Your Love Made a U-Turn" – 2:15
 "The Lifetime of a Man" – 2:26
 "Tell Me My Lying Eyes Are Wrong " – 2:46
 "Ring of Fire" (June Carter Cash, Merle Kilgore) – 2:57

References

1968 albums
James Carr (musician) albums